Kiri Tontodonati (born 4 September 1994) is an Italian rower twice bronze medal winner at senior level at the European Rowing Championships. She competed at the 2020 Summer Olympics, in Pair.

Biography
Kiri, an Australian by birth, became an Italian citizen thanks to her marriage to the Italian canoeing coach Matteo Tontodonati. In addition, his father-in-law Mauro is her coach, her brother-in-law Federico is an Italian national team racewalker and her sister-in-law Letizia (born in 1999) is she also a rower.

Achievements

See also
 Tontodonati

References

External links
 

1994 births
Living people
Italian female rowers
Rowers of Fiamme Oro
Rowers at the 2020 Summer Olympics
20th-century Italian women
21st-century Italian women